Dark Princess, written by sociologist W. E. B. Du Bois in 1928, is one of his five historical novels.  One of Du Bois's favorite works, the novel explores the beauty of people of color around the world. This was part of Du Bois' use of fiction to explore his times in a way not possible in non-fiction history. He expressed fully imagined lives of his characters, using them to explore the richness and beauty of black culture. The novel was not well received when published. It was criticized for its expression of eroticism as well as for what some critics thought was a failed attempt at social realism.

Structure
The book is divided into four large chapters: "The Exile," "The Pullman Porter," "The Chicago Politician," and "The Maharaja of Bwodphur". The sections deal with different stages in the protagonist's life, moving from his self-imposed exile in Germany late in life, to his early employment as a porter on the railroads, based in New York, then to his career as a politician in Chicago, and his return to Virginia, the land of his birth. While the sections trace the protagonist's growth as a revolutionary figure, they are not directly connected.

Plot
The plot follows a character named Matthew Townes, a college student in his junior year at the University of Manhattan studying to be an obstetrician. Early in the novel, Townes is told that not only is he barred from pursuing his career aspirations, he is not allowed to finish his academic studies. His status as an African American disqualifies him in the early 20th century from completing required courses at a white obstetrics hospital, where he would be caring for white female patients.

Townes is devastated and goes to Germany in a kind of exile. There he meets Princess Kautilya of Bwodpur, India, daughter of a maharajah. She reassures Towns of the importance of the history of people of color in the world, and of their presence and impact of their beauty worldwide.  The Princess takes him from his dreary American world with its strict binary divide by race. She introduces him to a vibrant world of prominent world leaders of color, while acknowledging some with  negative influence on the progress of blacks in the United States. Du Bois is believed to be referring to the leader Marcus Garvey in his character Perigua.

The relationship between Townes and the princess develops; she bears his child, who by birthright is the Maharajah of Bwodpur. Townes had not thought it possible that an African American man might have such a connection to royalty.

Major themes
 
Du Bois explores internationalism and international racial solidarity, as well as corruption and violent radicalism within African-American culture.

Dark Princess’s subtitle, A Romance, points to the narrative’s double valence. As Michèle Mendelssohn argues, "it is the story of a love affair, as well as the story of an ideological romance that challenges one of the United States’ most cherished ideas about itself, the notion that it is a land of progress and possibility for all. The love lost between the hero and the U. S. is the spur for the novel’s political reorientation."

Historical contexts
Some critics believe that the book was inspired by the 1911 First Universal Races Congress in London, which Du Bois had attended. In developing the character of Kautilya, Du Bois has been discussed as possibly drawing inspiration from a few historical figures. Scholars have speculated that these may include an unnamed Indian princess at the Universal Races Congress, the Indian independence activist Bhikaji Cama, and the Pan-African Congress organizer Ida Gibbs Hunt, wife of diplomat William Henry Hunt.

Late in life, Du Bois described this as his favorite work.

See also

 1928 in literature
 Lists of books

References

1928 American novels
African-American novels
English-language novels
Novels about racism
Works by W. E. B. Du Bois